Tunisia participated in the 2004 Summer Paralympics in Athens. Tunisians athletes won a total of eight gold medals, seven silver and three bronze.

Medallists

Sports

Athletics

Men's track

Men's field

Women's track

Women's field

Media 
Tunisian broadcasting rights for the 2004 Games were acquired before the start of the Games.

See also
Tunisia at the Paralympics
Tunisia at the 2004 Summer Olympics

References

External links
International Paralympic Committee

Nations at the 2004 Summer Paralympics
2004
Paralympics